Events from the year 1985 in Pakistan.

Incumbents 
 # Martial law and ban on political parties lifted.
 # General elections held under military rule. 
 # Controversial eighth Amendment is passed. 
 # March 24—Military chief Zia-ul Haq resigns from prime minister ship and Mohammad Khan Junejo (1932-1993) of Pakistan Muslim League becomes twelfth prime minister.
 # Gen.  Zia ul-Haq of Military President.

Federal government
 President: Muhammad Zia-ul-Haq
 Prime Minister: Muhammad Khan Junejo (starting 24 March)
 Chief Justice: Mohammad Haleem

Governors 
Governor of Balochistan: Ghulam Ali khetran (until 30 December); Musa Khan (starting 30 December)
Governor of Khyber Pakhtunkhwa: Fazle Haq (until 12 December); Nawabzada Abdul Ghafoor Khan Hoti (starting 30 December)
Governor of Punjab: Ghulam Jilani Khan (until 30 December); Sajjad Hussain Qureshi (starting 30 December)
Governor of Sindh: Jahan Dad Khan

Events 
 Martial law and the ban on political parties are lifted (8th amendment).

Births 
February 2 - Sanam Saeed, actress
April 13 – Shoaib Khan, left-handed batsman
June 28 - Wahab Riaz, cricketer

See also
1984 in Pakistan
1986 in Pakistan
Timeline of Pakistani history
List of Pakistani films of 1985

External links
 Timeline Pakistan (from BBC)

 
1985 in Asia